Pachydesmoceras is a genus of ammonites belonging to the family Desmoceratidae.

Species of this genus were fast-moving nektonic carnivorous shelled cephalopods. 
They lived during the Cretaceous, from the Albian (112.0-99.6 Mya) to the Santonian (85.8-83.5 Mya) stage.

Distribution
Cretaceous of Antarctica, Cameroon, India, Japan, Nigeria, Romania, United States (California).

See also
 Cephalopod size

References

 Sepkoski, Jack Sepkoski's Online Genus Database – Cephalopodes 
 Paleobiology Database
 Adrian Kin First record of the puzosiine ammonite genus Pachydesmoceras from the Middle and Upper Turonian of Poland
 Tatsuro Matsumoto Note on Pachydesmoceras, a Cretaceous ammonite genus

Ammonites of Europe
Ammonites of North America
Ammonitida genera
Desmoceratidae
Cretaceous ammonites